Voliba is a genus of moths of the family Crambidae described by Walker in 1866.

Species
Voliba asphyctopa Turner, 1908
Voliba gigantea Hampson, 1912
Voliba leptomorpha Turner, 1908
Voliba psammoessa Turner, 1908
Voliba pycnosticta Turner, 1908
Voliba scoparialis Walker, 1866

References

Spilomelinae
Crambidae genera
Taxa named by Francis Walker (entomologist)